Kadr may refer to:

 Ahmed bin Kadr Labed, Algerian Guantanamo Bay detainee
 KADR, radio station licensed to serve the community of Elkader, Iowa
 KADR (studio), Polish film studio established in 1955
 KADR (singer), Turkish singer

See also
 Khadr (disambiguation), similar Arabic name